Joan Stewart, Countess of Morton, also called Joanna (c. 1428 – 22 June 1493), was the daughter of James I, King of Scotland, and the wife of James Douglas, 1st Earl of Morton. She was known, in Latin, as the muta domina [mute lady] of Dalkeith.

Life
Born in Scotland , she was the third daughter of James I of Scotland and Joan Beaufort. Joan had two younger brothers, including the future King of Scotland, James II, and five sisters. She had “the misfortune to be deaf and dumb”, and was known as muta domina or “the mute lady”.  Joan was reported to have used sign language to communicate, even in public (although it was considered at that time to be impolite).

Joan was originally contracted to marry The 3rd Earl of Angus on 18 October 1440, but he died (without issue) in 1446 before the marriage could take place. In 1445 she was sent to France and did not return home to Scotland until 1457. She had been promised in marriage to the Dauphin of France but the marriage did not take place, probably due to her inability to articulate. Joan married The 4th Baron Dalkeith before 15 May 1459, who at the time of their marriage was raised to the peerage as the first Earl of Morton. They were granted a dispensation on 7 January 1463-4 for being consanguineous in the second and third degrees.  Joan and her husband James were both aware of their close relationships but were persuaded to marry by her brother King James II of Scotland and applied for the dispensation to legitimize their marriage. The Countess Joanna died in 1493, predeceasing her husband, James, by four months.

The Morton Monument

The Earl and Countess of Morton were buried together in the choir of the parish church of St. Nicholas Buccleuch, known as the Dalkeith Collegiate Church, in Dalkeith, south of Fife and east of Edinburgh, in Midlothian, Scotland.  Known as the Morton Monument, their tombs are covered with their stone effigies, complete with their armorial bearings.  This is believed to be the world's oldest image of a known deaf person.  The choir is now in the ruins, leaving the tombs out in the open, where, in a few centuries, the elements have erased their faces. Their hands, pressed together in prayer, were likely to have been destroyed during the Reformation. Today, as one of the visitors remarked, “[o]nce crisply carved and detailed with heraldic devices”, the tombs have “the look of sand sculptures after the tide has washed in and retreated”. Due to their historical value, in 2005 a team of volunteers and preservationists created a protective canopy over their effigies.

Family
Together Joan and her husband James had four children:
 Sir John Douglas, 2nd Earl of Morton (bef. 1466–1513), killed at the Battle of Flodden
 James, (d. aft. 1480) appeared in several writs 1466–1480.
 Janet, married bef. 1 February 1480–81 to Sir Patrick Hepburn, 1st Earl of Bothwell.
 Elizabeth, mentioned in a charter of 1479 after which nothing further is known of her.

Ancestry

Notes

References

Deaf royalty and nobility
Scottish princesses
Morton
Year of birth uncertain
Scottish deaf people
1428 births
1493 deaths
Daughters of kings